Qin Miaomiao (born 11 December 1996) is a Chinese rower. She competed in the women's coxless four event at the 2020 Summer Olympics.

References

External links
 

1996 births
Living people
Chinese female rowers
Olympic rowers of China
Rowers at the 2020 Summer Olympics
Place of birth missing (living people)